Frank Tyndall Broun (31 May 1876 – 1 April 1930) was an Australian politician who was a member of the Legislative Assembly of Western Australia from 1911 to 1914 and again from 1917 to 1924. He was a minister in the first government of Sir James Mitchell.

Broun was born in Beverley, Western Australia, to Emily Jane (née Lukin) and James William Broun. His grandfather, Peter Broun, was the first Colonial Secretary of Western Australia. After a period working for his father, Broun acquired an estate of  near Beverley, on which he farmed both sheep and wheat. He was elected to the Beverley Road Board in 1902, and remained a member for most of the following 20 years, including as chairman on three occasions (1908–1909, 1911–1914, and 1917–1919). Broun was first elected to parliament at the 1911 state election, replacing Nat Harper in the seat of Beverley. A member of the Liberal Party, he left parliament at the 1914 election, and was replaced by a Country Party candidate, Charles Wansbrough.

At the 1917 state election, Wansbrough did not re-contest Beverley. Broun, who had switched to the Country Party himself, reclaimed his former seat. In June 1919, he was selected to replace John Scaddan (another Country Party member) as Colonial Secretary in the government of James Mitchell, who had become premier only the previous month. After the 1921 state election, Broun was also made Minister for Public Health, replacing Hal Colebatch. He left the ministry in August 1922, with Richard Sampson taking over both of his portfolios. The Country Party split into two rival factions the following year, with Broun joining the Ministerial faction (which supported the Mitchell government). However, he did not recontest his seat at the 1924 state election. Broun died at his home in Beverley in April 1930, aged 53. He had committed suicide by taking cyanide. Broun had married May Constance Sewell in 1903, with whom he had three sons and three daughters.

References

1876 births
1930 suicides
Australian people of Guernsey descent
Australian politicians who committed suicide
Mayors of places in Western Australia
Members of the Western Australian Legislative Assembly
People from Beverley, Western Australia
Suicides by cyanide poisoning
Suicides in Western Australia
1930 deaths
Western Australian local councillors